Meiros Megale was a town of ancient Phrygia, inhabited during Roman and Byzantine times. 

Its site is located near Avdan-Teşvikiye in Asiatic Turkey.

References

Populated places in Phrygia
Former populated places in Turkey
Roman towns and cities in Turkey
Populated places of the Byzantine Empire
History of Kütahya Province